Goniozus is a genus of parasitic wasps in the family Bethylidae. There are at least 20 described species in Goniozus.

Species
These 23 species belong to the genus Goniozus:

 Goniozus akitsushimanus Terayama, 2006 g
 Goniozus asperulus b
 Goniozus claripennis (Foerster, 1851) g
 Goniozus disjunctus (Kieffer, 1926) g
 Goniozus distigmus Thomson, 1862 g
 Goniozus gallicola (Kieffer, 1905) g
 Goniozus gestroi (Kieffer, 1904) g
 Goniozus inauditus Santhosh g
 Goniozus indicus (Ashmead, 1903) g
 Goniozus jacintae Farrugia, 1971 c g
 Goniozus japonicus Maa, 1904 g
 Goniozus jamiei Ward, 2013 g
 Goniozus koreanus Lim g
 Goniozus kuriani Santhosh g
 Goniozus legneri Gordh, 1982 b (Goniozus navel orangeworm wasp)
 Goniozus maurus Marshall, 1905 g
 Goniozus mesolevis Lim g
 Goniozus mobilis Foerster, 1860 g
 Goniozus musae Ward, 2013 g
 Goniozus plugarui Nagy, 1976 g
 Goniozus punctatus Kieffer, 1914 g
 Goniozus tibialis Vollenhoven, 1878 g
 Goniozus yoshikawai Terayama, 2006 g

Data sources: i = ITIS, c = Catalogue of Life, g = GBIF, b = Bugguide.net

References

Further reading

External links

 

Parasitic wasps
Chrysidoidea